The Only Girl is a 1933 British-German musical film directed by Friedrich Hollaender and starring Lilian Harvey, Charles Boyer, and Mady Christians. It is the English-language version of The Empress and I which also starred Harvey and Christians. It was the last in a series of MLV co-productions between UFA and Gainsborough Pictures. It was released in the United States in 1934 by Fox Film.

Cast

References

Bibliography

External links 
 

1933 films
1933 musical comedy films
German historical comedy films
1930s historical comedy films
British historical comedy films
British musical comedy films
Films of the Weimar Republic
Films set in the 19th century
Films set in Paris
German multilingual films
British multilingual films
UFA GmbH films
Gainsborough Pictures films
Films produced by Erich Pommer
German musical comedy films
1933 multilingual films
British historical musical films
1930s historical musical films
German historical musical films
1930s English-language films
1930s British films
1930s German films
English-language German films